Khedivate's Somali Coast was a short-lived dominion of the Khedivate of Egypt over a few ports of the northern Somali coast. It came about when in 1874 Isma'il Pasha ordered the dispatch of two warships and three Khedival ships of the line towards the northern Somali coast. Ten years later, due to an internal rebellion in the Egyptian khedivate's mainland territories, it was forced to abandon its Somali territories in 1884, and Britain began to take over these ports. Controversies which existed during Egyptian administration included the payment of port duties by the Khedivate to the Ottomans, the inspection of the status of slave trade, and the demarcation of territory with the French Somali Coast as well as the Abyssinian towards the west.

See also
Garissa

References

Egypt under the Muhammad Ali dynasty
History of Somalia